The Eritrean Catholic Eparchy of Barentu is a Catholic eparchy located in the town of Barentu in Eritrea. It is a part of the ecclesiastical province of Asmara.

History
On 21 December 1995, Pope John Paul II established the Eparchy of Barentu from the Eparchy of Asmara and it became a suffragan of the Ethiopian Catholic Archeparchy of Addis Abeba. With the establishment of the autonomous sui iuris Eritrean Catholic Church by Pope Francis in January 2015, the Eparchy of Barentu became a suffragan the Eritrean Catholic Archeparchy of Asmara.

Ordinaries
Luca Milesi, O.F.M. Cap. † (21 Dec 1995 - 4 Oct 2001) 
Thomas Osman, O.F.M. Cap. (4 Oct 2001 - present)

References

Eritrean Catholic Church
Christian organizations established in 1995